205 (Scottish) Field Hospital is a unit of the Royal Army Medical Corps within the Army Reserve of the British Army.

History
The hospital was formed upon the formation of the TAVR in 1967, from the amalgamation of 5th (City of Glasgow) General Hospital, 50th (Scottish) Casualty Clearing Station, 155th (Lowland) Field Ambulance, and 157th (Lowland) Field Ambulance, as 205 (Scottish) General Hospital. Throughout the Cold War, the hospital was under 51st (Highland) Infantry Brigade; and on transfer to war, would re-subordinate to Commander Medical BAOR, to provide 800 beds to the 4th Garrison Area. During the reforms implemented after the Cold War, the hospital was re-designated as 205 (Scottish) Field Hospital. As a consequence of Army 2020, the unit now falls under 2nd Medical Brigade, and is paired with 34 Field Hospital.

Under the Future Soldier programme, the hospital will amalgamate with 225th (Scottish) Medical Regiment to form the new 215th (Scottish) Multi-Role Medical Regiment by September 2023.  The new regiment will come under 2nd Medical Group.

Current Structure
The hospital's current structure is as follows:
Headquarters, at Glasgow
A Detachment, at Gordon Barracks, Aberdeen
D Detachment, at Oliver Barracks, Dundee
E Detachment, at Edinburgh
G Detachment, at Glasgow
I Detachment, at Inverness

References

Military units and formations established in 1967
Units of the Royal Army Medical Corps